"Sentimi" is a song by Italian rapper and singer Madame. It was produced by Crookers and released on 24 April 2020 by Sugar Music.

Music video
The lyric video for "Sentimi", directed by Thaevil and illustrated by Sindi Abazi, premiered on 30 April 2020 via Madame's YouTube channel.

Track listing

Charts

References

2020 songs
2020 singles
Madame (singer) songs
Sugar Music singles